Armudaghaj (also Romanized as Ārmūdāghāj) is a village in Nazluchay Rural District, Nazlu District, Urmia County, West Azerbaijan Province, Iran. At the 2006 census, its population was 72, in 24 families.

References 

Populated places in Urmia County